Lower Hewa Hydropower Station (Nepali: तल्लो हेवा जलविद्युत आयोजना) is a run-of-river hydro-electric plant located in   Panchthar District of Nepal. The flow from Hewa River, a tributary of Tamor River, is used to generate 21.6 MW electricity. 

The plant is owned and developed by Mountain Hydro Nepal (P.) Ltd, an IPP of Nepal. The plant started generating electricity from 2076-04-21BS. The generation licence will expire in 2105-04-08 BS, after which the plant will be handed over to the government.  The power station is connected to the national grid and the electricity is sold to Nepal Electricity Authority.

This power plant may get inundated if Tamor Hydropower Project will be constructed in its downstream.

See also

List of power stations in Nepal

References

Hydroelectric power stations in Nepal
Gravity dams
Run-of-the-river power stations
Dams in Nepal
Irrigation in Nepal
Buildings and structures in Panchthar District